Goth Gorshani is a populated place located in Balochistan, on the route between the city of Quetta to Larkana in Sindh in Pakistan. It is located at 28°43'0N 68°15'0E. The name of the place is derived from a figure of  Sufism.

References

Populated places in Balochistan, Pakistan